With Love is an album by Tony Bennett, released in 1972. The album peaked at number 167 on the Billboard 200.

Track listing
"The Riviera" (Cy Coleman, Joseph Allen McCarthy) - 2:45
"Remind Me" (Jerome Kern, Dorothy Fields) - 3:51
"Here's That Rainy Day" (Johnny Burke, Jimmy Van Heusen) - 2:43
"Street of Dreams" (Sam M. Lewis, Victor Young) - 3:05
"Love" (Ralph Blane, Hugh Martin) - 2:56
"Twilight World" (Johnny Mercer, Marian McPartland) - 3:04
"Lazy Day in Love" (Robert Farnon, Milt Raskin) - 2:57
"Easy Come, Easy Go" (Johnny Green, Edward Heyman) - 3:00
"Harlem Butterfly" (Johnny Mercer) - 2:27
"Dream (When You're Feeling Blue)" (Johnny Mercer) - 2:45
"Maybe This Time" (Fred Ebb, John Kander) - 4:05

Personnel
 Tony Bennett - vocals
 John Bunch - piano
 Robert Farnon - arranger, conductor

References

External links 

 With love on Discogs

1972 albums
Tony Bennett albums
Albums arranged by Robert Farnon
Albums conducted by Robert Farnon
Columbia Records albums